The tambourine is a percussion instrument.

Tambourine or tamborine may also refer to:

Geography
Tamborine, Queensland, locality in Australia

Music
Tambourine Studios, Swedish recording studio 
Tambourine (band),  Dutch pop band 
The★tambourines, Japanese pop group

Albums
Tambourine (album) by Tift Merritt (2004)

Songs
"Tambourine" (song), by Eve
"Tamborine", from the Prince album Around the World in a Day
"Tambourine", song from the Elton John album Wonderful Crazy Night

See also
 Tambourin, a form of Provençal dance and music
 Tamburello, a court game played with tambourine-like racquets